Shunesburg Mountain is a  mountain in Zion National Park in Washington County, Utah, United States.

Description
It is wedged between Shunes Creek and the East Fork Virgin River which drain precipitation runoff from this mountain. This geographical feature is named for the ghost town of Shunesburg which was set between the west aspect of this mountain, and Johnson Mountain,  to the northwest directly across the mouth of Parunuweap Canyon. In turn, the town was named after Paiute Chief Shunes who sold the land in 1861 to the Mormon settlers who attempted to live there. Flooding from the Virgin River eventually forced the abandonment of the settlement, and drove the inhabitants to nearby Rockville.

Climate
Spring and fall are the most favorable seasons to visit Shunesburg Mountain. According to the Köppen climate classification system, it is located in a Cold semi-arid climate zone, which is defined by the coldest month having an average mean temperature below , and at least 50% of the total annual precipitation being received during the spring and summer.

See also

 List of mountains in Utah
 Geology of the Zion and Kolob canyons area
 Colorado Plateau

References

External links

 Zion National Park National Park Service
 Weather: Shunesburg Mountain

Mountains of Utah
Zion National Park
Mountains of Washington County, Utah
Sandstone formations of the United States
Colorado Plateau
North American 1000 m summits